Sasmaka Manor is a manor house located in a park near Lake Sasmaka west coast, near Valdemārpils, Talsi municipality, in the historical region of Courland, western Latvia.

History 
First mentioned in writings in 1582, the manor was built in 1886 and had as former owners the  family in the 17th century, the  family and the  family in the 18th century.

See also
List of palaces and manor houses in Latvia

References

Manor houses in Latvia
Talsi Municipality